Belarus selected their Junior Eurovision entry for 2008 through Song For Eurovision, a national final consisting of 20 songs which had to qualify through a semi final to get to the final. The winners were Dasha, Alina & Karina with the song Sertse Belarusi.

Before Junior Eurovision

Song for Eurovision

Semi-final 
The semi-final was pre-recorded on 27 May 2008, then broadcast on 1 June 2008. A jury decided the 10 songs that would go through to the final.

Final 
The final was broadcast live on 12 September 2008. The winning song was decided by 50% Televoting and 50% Jury, however only televoting results were announced, which was won by trio Dasha, Alina and Karina with Diana Gromova finishing 2nd.

At Eurovision 
On 14 October 2008 it was revealed that the Belarusian entry had been allocated spot 3 to perform in the final. At the Junior Eurovision Song Contest 2008 which took place on 22 November 2008, the performers wore dresses identical to the ones they wore at the national final. There were also three dancers which were also featured in the performance at the national final.

Voting

Notes

References

External links 
 Belarusian broadcaster's JESC 2008 website

Junior Eurovision Song Contest
Belarus
2008